Pagudpud, officially the Municipality of Pagudpud, is a 4th class municipality in the province of Ilocos Norte, Philippines. According to the 2020 census, it has a population of 25,098 people.

It is the northernmost settlement on Luzon Island and a popular tourist destination because of its resorts and beaches. In addition to tourism, people also make their living through farming, fishing and subsistence retailing. Recently, many windmills are erected in Barangay Caparispisan.

Pagudpud was made a municipality on 14 February 1954 through the leadership of Constante Benemerito. It was Rafael "Totoy" Benemerito, son of Constante, who spearheaded the establishment of the first municipal hall, municipal health center, public plaza, and public market. It had previously been a part of the neighboring town of Bangui.

Geography

The town's topography includes mountains, hills, valleys and flat coastal land.

Barangays 
Pagudpud is politically divided into 16 barangays. These barangays are headed by elected officials: Barangay Captain, Barangay Council, whose members are called Barangay Councilors. All are elected every three years.

Urban

Rural

Climate

Demographics

Religion 
Roman Catholicism is the major religion in Pagudpud. Yet, there's also increasing numbers of members of other Christian Denominations such as Jehovah's Witnesses (with two congregations) and Iglesia ni Cristo. Islam, brought by Muslim immigrants, is also practiced in Pagudpud.

Economy

Government 
Pagudpud, belonging to the first congressional district of the province of Ilocos Norte, is governed by a mayor designated as its local chief executive and by a municipal council as its legislative body in accordance with the Local Government Code. The mayor, vice mayor, and the councilors are elected directly by the people through an election which is being held every three years.

Elected officials

Municipal seal 

 Blue, Red, Yellow, and White, reflection of the colors of the Philippines 1954, the year Pagudpud was founded
 Coconut Tree and Ricefield, represents as farming as one of the economic resources of the town, with coconut, palay and vegetables as its major products
 Waterfall, represents Mabogobog falls, which is the source of a Mini Hydro Power Plant.
 Mountain, Tree and Logs, represents the forestry resources of the town
 Fish and Shrimps, represents its marine resources
 Shell with Pearl, symbolizes the tourism potential of the town which is famous for its white beaches
 North Star, stands for the location of the town of Pagudpud, which is in the northern tip of the Province.

Transportation

By land, Pagudpud is approximately a 90-minute bus ride from Laoag City. Several bus lines serve the Manila-Laoag route, namely Partas, Florida, Farinas, and Maria de Leon among others. Some bus lines serve also the Pan-Philippine highway, the Asian Highway ends here for Taiwan the 27th Nation, dropping by in Pagudpud, namely Chona Patrick, GMW, St. Joseph, Gabriel, and the Pan-Philippine highway route buses of Maria de Leon and Florida.

Gallery

See also
Patapat Viaduct

References

External links

Municipality of Pagudpud
[ Philippine Standard Geographic Code]
Philippine Census Information
Local Governance Performance Management System

Municipalities of Ilocos Norte
Beaches of the Philippines